Mark Knowles and Daniel Nestor were the defending champions but did not compete that year.

Leander Paes and David Rikl won in the final 6–3, 6–0 against Wayne Black and Kevin Ullyett.

Seeds

  Mahesh Bhupathi /  Max Mirnyi (semifinals)
  Jonas Björkman /  Todd Woodbridge (semifinals)
  Donald Johnson /  Jared Palmer (quarterfinals)
  Martin Damm /  Cyril Suk (first round)

Draw

External links
 2003 Dubai Tennis Championships Doubles Draw

2003 Dubai Tennis Championships and Duty Free Women's Open
Doubles